Armand Alexandre Castagny (Vannes 30 November 1807 – 13 November 1900 Belle Île) was a French general.

Military life

Beginning of his military career 
As a lieutenant, Armand Alexander de Castagny was at the French siege of Antwerp in 1832. He later served in Algiers.

During the Second Empire, he fought in all of the Napoleonic Wars. He was promoted to lieutenant colonel at the start of the Easter Wars; he became a colonel of light infantry and he participated at the attack on Crimea in the Battle of Chernaya. He was awarded numerous distinctions and decorations after this conflict.

As a Brigade General in Italy, he was given the second regiment of Zouaves and the Foreign Legion. During the Battle of Magenta he was with General Espinasse, who died by his side.

In Mexico 
In Mexico he served in the siege of Puebla. he also marched towards Monterrey, then through the Sierra Madre Oriental towards Mazatlán. Having become general of division (1864), Maximilian I put him in charge of the "Great Command of the Northwest" and was sent as a forlorn hope troop to Sonora and Sinaloa. He burned the city of San Sebastián and shot the rebel Nicolás Romero and his companions.

In Europe 
In 1870, Castagny became Commander of a division of the 3rd Corps of Infantry. At Forbach, in the midst of Frossard's mistakes and Bazaine's inaction, he was the one who fought to free the 2nd corps. He was locked up in Metz with the Army of the Rhine, and showed cold-bloodedness and courage at the Battle of Borny–Colombey, where he was seriously wounded.

After returning from captivity, Castagny was assigned to the second section of the General Staff in France in 1872 and then retired in 1878. He retired first to the region of Nantes and then to Paris, before moving definitely to a hotel room in Belle-Île-en-Mer.

Death 
He died in 1900 in his bed, in his hometown of Vannes (Morbihan) at the age of 93, after a 43-year military career.

Military distinctions 
Knight of the Order of the Legion of Honor (October 21, 1838); Officer (April 11, 1850); Commander (June 12, 1856); Grand Officer (August 15, 1860).

Commemorative medal of the 1859 Italian Campaign (October 18, 1859).

Commemorative medal of the Mexico Expedition (April 21, 1864).

Knight-Companion of the Order of the Bath (April 26, 1856).

Crimea Medal (December 31, 1856).

Commander of the Order of the Medjidie (March 1856).

Medal of Military Valor of Sardinia (January 15, 1857)

Commander of the Order of Saints Maurice and Lazarus (February 29, 1860).

Grand Cross of the Order of Our Lady of Guadalupe (April 10, 1866).

References 

 Caraës Jean-François, Le général de Castagny (1807–1900), servir dans l'armée française sous le second empire, Paris, L'Harmattan, collection "Chemins de la mémoire", 2000.

1807 births
1900 deaths
People from Vannes
French generals
French military personnel of the Franco-Prussian War